Peter Kithene Wilson is a Kenyan - American and the founder of Mama Maria Clinics in Kenya. Kithene Wilson was named CNN Heroes Honoree in 2007 (https://www.youtube.com/watch?v=gokirxyoKKk) for his work in developing rural healthcare in Africa. In 2008, he was named as one of the University of Washington’s “Wondrous 100” alumni.

Kithene Wilson was born in Muhuru Bay village in Kenya, one of 10 siblings. When he was 12-years-old, his parents died of an undiagnosed disease. He earned a scholarship to the Nairobi's Starehe Boys Centre and School and then attended the University of Washington where he received a Bachelor's degree in Psychology in 2007.

Further reading
https://crosscut.com/2007/12/from-cnn-big-kudos-for-immigrant-uw-student

References

Living people
Year of birth missing (living people)
University of Washington College of Arts and Sciences alumni
Kenyan businesspeople